Arthur Gomes may refer to:

Arthur Gomes (footballer), full name Arthur Gomes Lourenço, Brazilian footballer
Arthur Gomes (rugby union), French rugby union player

See also 
Arthur Gómez (born 1984), Gambian former professional footballer